The International Network for Traditional Building, Architecture & Urbanism (INTBAU) is an international organization established in 2001.  The organization arose from a research project initiated in 2000 at The Prince's Foundation for the Built Environment and undertaken by Dr Matthew Hardy, an architect and architectural historian. INTBAU is "dedicated to the support of traditional building, the maintenance of local character and the creation of better places to live", and has a Central Office located with three  related charities in The Prince's Foundation for the Built Environment building in Shoreditch, London, United Kingdom.

Since April 2004 it has been an independent registered educational, first as Charity no. 1103068 and more recently Charity no. 1132362. INTBAU remains under the patronage of the Prince of Wales, though it has now become a subsidiary company of The Prince's Foundation.

Charter 

INTBAU's work is guided by its charter, the founding document of the organization:

"The International Network for Traditional Building, Architecture & Urbanism is an active network of individuals and institutions dedicated to the creation of humane and harmonious buildings and places which respect local traditions.

Traditions allow us to recognize the lessons of history, enrich our lives and offer our inheritance to the future. Local, regional and national traditions provide the opportunity for communities to retain their individuality with the advance of globalization. Through tradition we can preserve our sense of identity and counteract social alienation.   People must have the freedom to maintain their traditions.

Traditional buildings and places maintain a balance with nature and society that has been developed over many generations. They enhance our quality of life and are a proper reflection of modern society. Traditional buildings and places can offer a profound modernity beyond novelty and look forward to a better future.

INTBAU brings together those who design, make, maintain, study or enjoy traditional building, architecture and places.   We will gain strength, significance and scholarship by association, action and the dissemination of our principles."

Chapters 

The organization now has chapters (regional sub-groups) in Albania, Afghanistan, Australia, Bangladesh, Canada, China, Cuba, Cyprus, Czechia, Estonia, Ethiopia, Finland, Germany, India, Iran, Ireland, Italy, Malaysia, Montenegro, the Netherlands, New Zealand, Nigeria, Pakistan, the Philippines, Poland, Portugal, Romania, Russia, Spain, Sweden, Turkey and the USA. Each chapter signs a "chapter agreement" - a kind of franchise document - with the College of Chapters, the central decision-making body of the international organization. Chapters are then free to undertake their own projects subject to an allocation of central office resources and time, approved by the College of Chapters. Projects are generally initiated by Chapters or members and resourced locally in line with the organization's overall environmental and social focus.

ICTP 

INTBAU operates the INTBAU College of Traditional Practitioners (ICTP), a peak peer-reviewed professional organization for architects, artists, academics and others working in traditional styles. Members must have produced at least 5 years of work of the "highest standard" and pass an entry examination by portfolio. There are currently 39 members of the ICTP.

Journal of Traditional Building, Architecture and Urbanism
The Journal of Traditional Building, Architecture and Urbanism is a magazine aimed at providing a better knowledge of the traditional constructive cultures of the various regions of the world. It includes original academic articles, peer-review publications and follows all the usual practices of scientific journals. It is organized by the Spanish Chapter of INTBAU, together with the Rafael Manzano Prize through the financial support of the Richard H. Driehaus Charitable Trust, and is a trilingual publication, published in English, Spanish and Portuguese.

See also 
Driehaus Architecture Prize
Traditional architecture

References

External links
 INTBAU homepage
 INTBAU archive 2001-2010

Architecture organisations based in the United Kingdom
Vernacular architecture
New Urbanism
Cultural heritage organizations
Year of establishment missing
New Classical architecture
Architecture groups
Architecture organizations